is a Japanese economist. He is a professor at the National Graduate Institute for Policy Studies (GRIPS) in Tokyo.

Hayashi received his Bachelor of Arts from the University of Tokyo and his Ph.D. from Harvard University in 1980. He has taught at Northwestern University, the University of Tokyo, the University of Tsukuba, Osaka University, the University of Pennsylvania, Columbia University, and Hitotsubashi University.

Hayashi is the author of a standard graduate-level textbook on econometrics .

He was a Fellow of the Econometric Society since 1988. He was awarded the inaugural Nakahara Prize in 1995. He was elected as foreign honorary member of the American Academy of Arts and Sciences in 2005 and the American Economic Association in 2020.

Selected publications

Books

Journal articles

References

External links
 Personal website
 Faculty profile at GRIPS

1952 births
Living people
People from Gifu Prefecture
20th-century  Japanese  economists
21st-century  Japanese  economists
Neoclassical economists
Macroeconomists
Econometricians
University of Tokyo alumni
Harvard University alumni
Academic staff of Osaka University
Academic staff of Hitotsubashi University
Academic staff of the University of Tokyo
Academic staff of the University of Tsukuba
Columbia University faculty
University of Pennsylvania faculty
Northwestern University faculty
Academic staff of National Graduate Institute for Policy Studies
Laureates of the Imperial Prize
Fellows of the Econometric Society
Fellows of the American Academy of Arts and Sciences
Presidents of the Japanese Economic Association